The prime minister of Serbia (masculine: премијер/premijer), officially the president of the Government of the Republic of Serbia (masculine: председник/predsednik) is the principal executive minister of the Government of Serbia. The prime minister directs the work of the government, and submits to the National Assembly the government's program, including a list of proposed ministers. The resignation of the prime minister results in the dismissal of the government.

The first officeholder was Matija Nenadović, who became prime minister on 27 August 1805. The current prime minister, Ana Brnabić was nominated by the former prime minister and current president of the Republic, Aleksandar Vučić, and elected and appointed by the National Assembly on 29 June 2017. Brnabić currently heads her third cabinet, which was formed on 26 October 2022.

History of the office
During the period of Revolutionary Serbia, the title of the principal executive minister was President of the Governing Council. Initially the Council had no ministers, just members, but in 1811 modern ministries were created. Government ceased to exist with the collapse of the First Serbian Uprising on 3 October 1813, however later continued in exile in Hotin (Russian Empire) from 1813 until 1814.

Government was restored on 21 November 1815 following the Second Serbian Uprising. Head of government was styled Prince's Representative (Књажевски представник / Knjaževski predstavnik). The style remained official until 1861, even after the establishing of constitutional government in 1835. Prior to that date, the office was of no major importance or influence and depended solely on the will of the Prince Miloš Obrenović.

From 1861 until 1903, the head of government was styled President of the Ministry (Председник министарства / Predsednik ministarstva).

From 1903 until the creation of the Kingdom of the Serbs, Croats and Slovenes on 1 December 1918, head of government was styled President of the Council of Ministers (Председник Министарског савета / Predsednik Ministarskog saveta).

Under the communist regime after 1945, Serbia got a sort of separate KPJ-appointed government opposed to the German-installed one in September 1941. First, the 'head of government' was styled President of the Executive Council of the Supreme National Liberational Council until 7 March 1945. On that day, a ministry for Serbia was created within the government of Yugoslavia (as for all the other five republics), with Minister for Serbia being in charge of creating first one-party government of post-War Serbia, which took place on 9 April 1945. Governments were headed by President of the Government until 3 February 1953, President of the Executive Council until 15 January 1991 and again President of the Government since then, but the term Prime Minister is colloquially used (especially in the media) since the government of Dragutin Zelenović in 1991. In some later articles about the recent history of Serbia, term is retroactively applied to Stanko Radmilović, Desimir Jevtić and even back to Ivan Stambolić's government.

List of prime ministers of Serbia

Revolutionary Serbia (1804–1813)

Principality of Serbia (1815–1882)

Kingdom of Serbia (1882–1918)

Socialist Republic of Serbia within SFR Yugoslavia (1945–1992)

Republic of Serbia within FR Yugoslavia / Serbia and Montenegro (1992–2006)

Republic of Serbia (2006–present)

See also
 Government of Serbia
 President of Serbia
 List of presidents of Serbia

Notes

References

External links
 Serbian Government
 Serbian ministries, etc. at rulers.org

Government of Serbia
 
Serbia, Prime Minister of
Prime Ministers
Lists of office-holders in Serbia
19th-century establishments in Serbia
1805 establishments in Europe